Anthony Clark (born 23 March 1977) is an Australian cricketer. He played six first-class and one List A matches for New South Wales between 2000/01 and 2001/02.

See also
 List of New South Wales representative cricketers

References

External links
 

1977 births
Living people
Australian cricketers
New South Wales cricketers
Cricketers from Sydney